George Thompson (30 May 1906 – 23 May 1986) was  a former Australian rules footballer who played with Footscray in the Victorian Football League (VFL).

Notes

External links 
		

1906 births
1986 deaths
Australian rules footballers from Victoria (Australia)
Western Bulldogs players